Founded in 1985, the Directors Guild Trust is the sister charity arm of the Directors Guild of Great Britain. The Trust supports the wider remit of promoting British directors' art and craft to a national and international public through education, events, commemorations and memorials.

Currently the Trust runs the DIRECT ACCESS Feature Film Directors' Mentoring Scheme, sponsored by Skillset and Film Four and in recent years has created blue plaque memorials and celebrations for famous British film directors Sir David Lean, Michael Powell and Alexander McKendrick.

The Trust is based in Central London.

References

External links
The Directors Guild Trust on Directors Guild of Great Britain website
 Michael Powell

Film organisations in the United Kingdom
1985 establishments in the United Kingdom
Organisations based in the London Borough of Camden
Organizations established in 1985
Television organisations in the United Kingdom